Corinth is an unincorporated community in Cullman County, Alabama, United States, located  west-northwest of West Point.

References

Unincorporated communities in Cullman County, Alabama
Unincorporated communities in Alabama